William Hewat was an Irish politician and company director. He was elected to Dáil Éireann as a Businessmen's Party Teachta Dála (TD) for the Dublin North constituency at the 1923 general election. He did not contest the June 1927 general election.

References

Year of birth missing
Year of death missing
Businesspeople from County Dublin
Members of the 4th Dáil
Politicians from County Dublin
Business and Professional Group TDs